The Fujifilm X-E3 is a digital rangefinder-style mirrorless camera announced by Fujifilm on September 7, 2017. It is part of the company's X-series range of cameras.

Design 
The design of the Fujifilm X-E3 is based on that of its predecessor models X-E2 and X-E2s, only that the case is about eight millimeters narrower and partly designed slightly differently. Both the X-E2s and the X-T20 have some differences in the operating concept, especially on the rear of the case.  With 337 grams of operational weight (without lens), the X-E3 is also slightly lighter than its predecessor and significantly lighter than the X-T20.

References

X-E3
Cameras introduced in 2017